Max Bösiger (born 23 December 1933) is a Swiss boxer. He competed in the men's heavyweight event at the 1960 Summer Olympics. At the 1960 Summer Olympics, he lost to Günter Siegmund of the United Team of Germany.

References

External links
 

1933 births
Living people
Heavyweight boxers
Swiss male boxers
Olympic boxers of Switzerland
Boxers at the 1960 Summer Olympics
People from Baden, Switzerland
Sportspeople from Aargau